Sarfaraz Khan was an 18th-century Nawab of Bengal.

Sarfaraz Khan may also refer to:

Sarfaraz Khan (actor) (born 1976), Indian film actor and producer 
Sarfaraz Khan (cricketer) (born 1996), Indian cricketer